Marcus Robert Munafo, surname also written Munafò, (born 23 January 1972) is a British psychologist who has been a professor of biological psychology at the University of Bristol's School of Experimental Psychology since 2010. He became the editor-in-chief of Nicotine & Tobacco Research in 2015.

Education
Munafo received his M.A. with honors from the University of Oxford in 1993, his M.Sc. from the University of Southampton in health psychology in 1995, and his Ph.D. in anxiety and surgery from the University of Southampton in 1999.

Research
Munafo's research focuses on, among other things, the health and psychological effects of tobacco and alcohol use. He has also researched scientific reproducibility for much of his career, starting when he was a student and failed to replicate findings he found in the literature. For example, a study he co-authored with Andrew Higginson found that incentivizing academics to produce a small number of highly cited studies also incentivized them to conduct many new, underpowered studies and fewer replication studies.

Recognition 
In 2017 Munafo received the Presidents' Award for Distinguished Contributions to Psychological Knowledge, an award given annually by the British Psychological Society.

References

External links

1972 births
Academics of the University of Bristol
Alumni of the University of Oxford
Alumni of the University of Southampton
British psychologists
Experimental psychologists
Living people
Medical journal editors
Tobacco researchers